Section Douglasia is a North American section within the genus Crataegus of species with black fruit.

Series
Series in section Douglasia include:
 Cerrones
 Douglasianae
 Purpureofructus

See also
 List of hawthorn species with black fruit

References

Section Douglasia
Flora of North America
Plant sections